Josef Heinen (11 April 1929 – 20 December 1988) was a German sprinter. He competed in the men's 4 × 100 metres relay at the 1952 Summer Olympics.

References

1929 births
1988 deaths
Athletes (track and field) at the 1952 Summer Olympics
German male sprinters
Olympic athletes of Germany
Place of birth missing